The 1980 United States presidential election in Wyoming took place on November 4, 1980. All 50 states and The District of Columbia were part of the 1980 United States presidential election. State voters chose three electors to the Electoral College, who voted for president and vice president.

Wyoming was won by former California Governor Ronald Reagan (R) by a 34-point landslide. Wyoming is a reliably Republican state, and the last Democratic presidential candidate to carry the state was Lyndon Johnson in 1964.

With 62.64% of the popular vote, Wyoming would prove to be Reagan's fifth strongest state in the 1980 election after Utah, Idaho, Nebraska and North Dakota.

Results

Results by county

See also
 United States presidential elections in Wyoming
 Presidency of Ronald Reagan

References

Wyoming
1980
1980 Wyoming elections